Coyet is a Dutch-Swedish noble family. Notable members of the family include:

Balthasar Coyett, Dutch-Swedish colonial official
Frederick Coyett, Swedish nobleman
Vilhelmina Eleonora Coyet, wife of Rutger Macklean, 2nd Friherre